Casey Dunn (born October 11, 1994) is a former American football center. He played college football at Auburn University. He signed with the Washington Redskins as an undrafted free agent in 2018.

College career
Dunn originally attended Jacksonville State University. After playing for JSU for three years and completing his junior year, he transferred to Auburn University in May 2017.

Dunn graduated JSU with a degree in industrial leadership. Upon transferring to Auburn, he entered the Masters program in community planning.

Professional career

Washington Redskins
Unselected in the 2018 NFL Draft, Dunn signed with the Washington Redskins after trying out at their rookie minicamp on May 2, 2018. After making the Redskins initial 53-man roster, Dunn played in two games before being waived on November 9, 2018, and was placed on their practice squad a few days later. He signed a reserve/future contract with the Redskins on December 31, 2018.

On July 31, 2019, Dunn was waived/injured by the Redskins and placed on injured reserve the next day. He was waived from injured reserve on September 24.

New Orleans Saints
On December 25, 2019, Dunn was signed to the New Orleans Saints practice squad. His practice squad contract with the team expired on January 13, 2020.

Cleveland Browns
On August 16, 2020, Dunn signed with the Cleveland Browns. He was waived with an injury designation on August 23, 2020, and subsequently reverted to the team's injured reserve list the next day. He was waived with an injury settlement on August 30, 2020.

References

External links
JSU Gamecocks bio
Washington Redskins bio

1994 births
Living people
Auburn Tigers football players
People from Trussville, Alabama
Players of American football from Alabama
Washington Redskins players
New Orleans Saints players
Cleveland Browns players